Cophecheilus is a genus of fish in the family Cyprinidae. These fish occur only in China.

Species
There are currently 2 recognized species in this genus:
 Cophecheilus bamen Y. Zhu, E. Zhang, M. Zhang & Y. Q. Han, 2011 
 Cophecheilus brevibarbatus A. Y. He, H. Wei, Y. He, Jian Yang, 2015

References 

 
Cyprinid fish of Asia
Freshwater fish of China